Botrychium pumicola, with the common name pumice moonwort, is a rare fern.

Distribution 
The fern is endemic to the Modoc Plateau in northern California and Crater Lake area in southern Oregon.

A specimen from a population found on Mount Shasta in California by Cooke in 1941 was thought to have been misidentified, but the specimen was recently reviewed by Farrar, and found to be correctly identified.  Botrychium pumicola was rediscovered on Mt. Shasta in 2008 by M. Colberg. It is also found in the Modoc National Forest.

Habitat
Pumice moonwort, as the common name suggests, live in dry, fine to course pumice gravel and scree without any admixture of humus, in places that retain moisture into late spring.  Its native landscape is open, fully exposed, sparsely vegetated pumice fields and gently rolling slopes, from subalpine lodgepole pine forest to above timberline.  It may also occur in Pinus contorta−Purshia tridentata basins with open frost pockets.  During the winter, it is usually covered by several feet of snow.  Botrychium pumicola has been found growing with B. lanceolatum and B. simplex.  Elevation of occurrence is from 4,240 to 9,065 feet above sea level.

Description
Botrychium pumicola is a mycorrhizal fern, and grows sporophytic gemmae (i.e., little structures for the asexual reproduction of the sporophytic, or diploid, phase of the plant's life cycle).  Some botanists believe that the gemmae might be adaptations to a dry climate and fires.
Another name for plants of the genus Botrychium is 'grapeferns,' since the sexual reproductive structures (synangia) look like tiny yellow-green grapes.

The plant is stout, with a very congested appearance, fleshy, 8–22 cm (3–9 in) high. Leaves appear in summer. Roots are abundant, 1 mm (0.004 in) or less in diameter.

Fronds are one or sometimes two, erect, 6–14 cm, 2-5½ in, long, the common stalk hypogean, 4–9 cm, 1½-3½ in, long and 2-3½ mm, 0.08-0.14 in, in diameter, thickly sheathed with the stems of old fronds.  Trophophore is sessile or nearly so; stalk 0–10 mm, 0-0.4 in, a tenth to a half the length of trophophore rachis; blade is dull, strongly glaucous, whitish green, deltate (triangular), thickly leathery, twice pinnate, with apex bent down in vernation, 2–4 cm, 1-1½ in, long and 1½-4 cm, ½-1½ in, broad; ternate, the middle division the largest, broadly oblong to rounded-deltoid, the lateral ones similar or rhombic-oblong, all pinnately parted; pinnae closely imbricate (overlapping), up to 6 pairs, strongly ascending, sublunate to flabelliform, broadly crenate to incised, or the larger ones radially cleft into cuneiform lobes; distance between 1st and 2nd pinnae not or slightly more than between the 2nd and 3rd pairs, asymmetrically cuneate; basal pinna pair often divided into 2 unequal parts, lobed to tip, margins entire, sinuate to shallowly crenate, apex rounded to truncate, venation pinnate.

The trophophore is located high on the common stalk, but the common stalk is subterranean, giving the impression that the leaf originates near ground level. Sporophore is once to thrice pinnate, with the tip recurved in vernation, sessile or short-stalked, equalling or surpassing (1 to 1½ times) the sterile blade, but with the stalk shorter than the trophophore; extremely compact sporangial cluster.

Taxonomy
It is in the adder's-tongue family (Ophioglossaceae), and may be closely related to the whisk ferns of the family Psilotaceae. These two families together, according to recent research, share a common ancestor which appears to have diverged early on from the rest of the fern lineage; this probably explains the distinctive morphologies of the members of these two families.

There was speculation that Botrychium pumicola is a variety of Botrychium simplex.  The two species are indeed closely related, with Botrychium montanum also somewhat closely related. It has been determined that Botrychium pumicola  is  a separate species.

Ecology
The fire ecology of this plant is not known, but open, sparsely vegetated pumice probably does not carry fire well.  This plant is neither likely to encounter fire nor tolerate it well.

Conservation status and threats
U.S. Forest Service — Pacific Southwest Region, Sensitive Species.
California Native Plant Society Inventory of Rare and Endangered Plants — 2B.2  (Fairly endangered in California).
NatureServe Vulnerable species — Oregon State Rank S3; California State Rank S1; Global Rank G3.

Some of the principal threats to this species are fern collecting and habitat disruption caused by recreational use, timber harvesting, and pumice mining.

Field identification 
The best time of year to look for this plant is from July to September.  The sessile trophophore and very short-stalked sporophore serve to distinguish this species from B. simplex.  Pumice moonwort has a bluish-grey-green color, as opposed to B. lanceolatum, whose color is more yellow-green.

See also

List of plants on the Modoc National Forest

References

External links 

  Calflora Database: Botrychium pumicola (Pumice moonwort)
  Jepson Manual eFlora (TJM2) treatment of Botrychium pumicola
 UC CalPhotos gallery of Botrychium pumicola (pumice moonwort)

pumicola
Ferns of California
Flora of Oregon
Endemic flora of the United States
Ferns of the United States
~
~
Taxa named by Lucien Marcus Underwood